A list of films produced in Spain in 1969.

1969

External links
 Spanish films of 1969 at the Internet Movie Database

1969
Spanish
Films